The following units and commanders fought in the Defense of the Great Wall of the Second Sino-Japanese War. List as of 20 March 1933.

China

Military Committee (Peking branch) - Chairman Chiang Kai-shek, He Yingqin (deputy)
 1st Army Group - Commander in chief - Yu Xuezhong (defends Tianjin, Daigu and garrisons Tianjin-Pukou Railroad)
 Chief staff officer Liu Zhonggan
 51st Army - Yu Xuezhong 
 113th Division - Li Zhentang 
 111th Division - Dong Yingbin 
 114th Division - Chen Guanqun 
 118th Division - Du Jiwu 
 1st Cavalry Division - Zhang Chengde 
 2nd Army Group - Commander in chief Shang Zhen(defense Luan River and the Lengkou Pass)
 Chief staff officer - Lu Ji
 32nd Army - Shang Zhen  
 139th Division - Huang Guanghua 
 84th Division - Gao Guizi 
 141st Division - Gao Hongwen 
 142nd Division - Li Xingcun 
 4th Cavalry Division - Guo Xipeng
 57th Army - He Zhuguo 
 115th Division - Yao Dongfan 
 109th Division - He Zhuguo
 120th Division - Chang Jingwu  
 3rd Cavalry Division - Wang Jifeng
 3rd Army Group - Commander in chief Song Zheyuan(defense of the Xifengkou Pass )
 Vice-commander in chief - Pang Bingxun Qin Dechun
 Chief staff officer - Zhang Weifan
 29th Army - Song Zheyuan 
 37th Division - Feng Zhian  
 38th Division - Zhang Zizhong 
 2nd Temporary Division - Liu Ruming   
 40th Army - Pang Bingxun 
 5th Cavalry Division - Li Fu 
 115th Brigade - Liu Shirong 
 116th Brigade - Chen Chunrong
 4th Army Group - Commander in chief Wan Fulin(assists the 57th Army with three Divisions to defend the Lengkou pass) 
 Chief staff officer - Wang Jingru
 53rd Army - Wan Fulin  
 108th Division - Yang Zhengzhi
 10th Division - Shen Ke 
 106th Division - Shen gram 
 116th Division - Miao Chengliu
 119th Division - Sun Dequan
 129th Division - Wang Yongsheng 
 130th Division - Zhu Hongxun, Yu Zhaolin 
 2nd Cavalry Division - Huang Xiansheng
 8th Army Group - Commander in chief Yang Jie (defense of the Gubeikou pass)
 17th Army - Xu Tingyao
 2nd Division - Huang Jieyan
 25th Division - Guan Linzheng
 1st Cavalry Brigade - Li Jiading
 67th Army - Wang Yizhe  (defense of the Gubeikou pass)
 107th Division - Zhang Zhengfang
 110th Division - He Lizhong
 112th Division - Zhang Tingshu
 117th Division - Weng Zhaoyuan
 26th Army - Xiaozhi Chu
 44th Division Commander Xiaozhi Chu (concurrently) 
 Preparation Regiment (Turned over to the Peking branch of the Military Committee to direct)
 41st Army - Sun Kuiyuan
 117th Brigade - Ding Ting 
 118th Brigade - Liu Yueting 
 Reinforced 1st Brigade - Xing Yuchou
 105th Division - Liu Duoquan
 6th Cavalry Division - Bai Fengxiang
 83rd Division - Liu Kan
 5th Army Group - Commander in chief Tang Yulin
 Remnants of this defeated Army from Jehol had retreated into Chahar to the area of Dushikou and Luanping.  It operated from Guyuan observing eastern border of Jehol. 
 7th Army Group - Commander in chief Fu Zuoyi (defending eastern sector of the Great Wall line) 
 59th Army - Fu Zuoyi (concurrently)
 61st Army - Li Fuying 
 1st Cavalry Army - Zhao Chengshou
 Also in Rehe there were Feng Zhanhai’s 63rd Army and other Manchurian Anti-Japanese Righteous and Brave Army units of Li Zhongyi, Deng Wen and others.
Later Reinforcements from Chiang Kai-shek to defend Peiking.
 87th Division
 88th Division
 42nd Division - Feng Qinzai

Notes
 The Chinese forces defending the Great Wall consisted of 8 Army Groups composed of 14 Armies (including 1 Cavalry Army), 36 Divisions (6 were Cavalry Divisions), 19 brigades (8 of cavalry), and 3 artillery brigades.  This force amounted to approximately 250,000 men.

Sources
[1]  中国抗日战争正面战场作战记 (China's Anti-Japanese War Combat Operations) 
 Author : Guo Rugui, editor-in-chief Huang Yuzhang 
 Press : Jiangsu People's Publishing House 
 Date published : 2005-7-1 
  
 第二部分：从“九一八”事变到西安事变滦东战斗 3
Jehol 1933  
 Operation Jehol  
 Battles of the Great Wall

See also
Operation Nekka
Battle of Rehe

Great Wall
Great Wall